Puya riparia is a species in the genus Puya. This species is endemic to Bolivia.

References

riparia
Flora of Bolivia